El Beso de la Ciguatera is a song by Dominican Republic singer-songwriter Juan Luis Guerra released as the third single for his album Fogarate (1994) with the collaboration of Diblo Dibala. The song was released in January 23, 1995 by Karen Records. The track encompasses merengue with soukus. The song was a recipient of a Broadcast Music, Inc. (BMI) Latin Award in 1996. Commercially, it reached the top ten on the Billboard Hot Latin Songs and Tropical Airplay charts in the United States. It also received moderate airplay in Europe.

Tracklist 

 Spain CD Single (1994)
 El Beso De La Ciguatera (Radio Version) – 4:10
 El Beso De La Ciguatera (Maxi Version) – 4:50

Charts

References 

1995 songs
1995 singles
Juan Luis Guerra songs
Spanish-language songs
Songs written by Juan Luis Guerra